Wellington Crescent is an affluent neighbourhood in Winnipeg, Manitoba, Canada. It is known for its stately homes and for a small commercial area along Academy Road.

It is in the northern section of the River Heights community area, along the Assiniboine River, which marks the neighbourhood's northern boundary. Its other boundaries are Academy Road to the south, and the train tracks to the west.

Demographics and crime

The 615 dwellings in Wellington Crescent are worth an average of $686,148.

Crime 
Wellington Crescent has low rates of violent crime. In 2012, there was only one robbery, making the rate 62.3 per 100,000 residents. The break-and-enter rate was 996.9 per 100,000 residents and there were two attempted auto theft, but no actual cars stolen.

References

Neighbourhoods in Winnipeg

River Heights, Winnipeg